Bermuda competed at the 1956 Summer Olympics in Melbourne, Australia.

Sailing

Open

References
Official Olympic Reports

Nations at the 1956 Summer Olympics
1956
1956 in Bermudian sport